Riland is a surname. Notable people with the surname include:

 John Riland (died 1673), English Anglican priest of the 17th century
 W. Kenneth Riland (1912–1989), American osteopathic physician

See also
 Hiland (given name)
 Roland (name)